The Levy Baronetcy, of Humberstone Hall in the County of Leicester, was a title in the Baronetage of the United Kingdom. It was created on 4 February 1913 for Sir Maurice Levy, Liberal Member of Parliament for Loughborough from 1900 to 1918. The third Baronet served as High Sheriff of Leicestershire from 1937 to 1938. The title became extinct on his death in 1996.

Arthur Lever (who had assumed the surname of Lever), younger brother of the first Baronet, was created a baronet in 1911 (see Lever baronets).

Levy baronets, of Humberstone Hall (1913)
Sir Maurice Levy, 1st Baronet (1859–1933)
Sir Ewart Maurice Levy, 2nd Baronet (1897–1996)

References
Kidd, Charles, Williamson, David (editors). Debrett's Peerage and Baronetage (1990 edition). New York: St Martin's Press, 1990.

Extinct baronetcies in the Baronetage of the United Kingdom